Parshuram is an upazila of Feni District in the Division of Chittagong, in southeast Bangladesh.

Administration
Parshuram Upazila is divided into Parshuram Municipality and three union parishads: Boxmahmmud, Chitholia, and Mirzanagar. The union parishads are subdivided into 157 mauzas and 71 villages.

Parshuram Municipality is subdivided into 9 wards and 15 mahallas.

References

External links
 Official Map of Parshuram

Upazilas of Feni District